National Tertiary Route 733, or just Route 733 (or ) is a National Road Route of Costa Rica, located in the Alajuela province.

Description
In Alajuela province the route covers Los Chiles canton (San Jorge district), Guatuso canton (San Rafael district).

References

Highways in Costa Rica